Pease is a city in Mille Lacs County, Minnesota, United States. The population was 242 at the 2010 census.

History
A post office called Pease was established in 1894, and remained in operation until 1994. Pease was named by railroad officials.

Geography

Pease is located between Milaca and Princeton on U.S. Route 169, approximately 60 miles north-northwest of Minneapolis.

Demographics

2010 census
As of the census of 2010, there were 242 people, 86 households, and 63 families residing in the city. The racial makeup of the city was 97.9% White, 0.8% Asian, 0.8% from other races, and 0.4% from two or more races. Hispanic or Latino of any race were 1.7% of the population.

There were 86 households, of which 44.2% had children under the age of 18 living with them, 50.0% were married couples living together, 12.8% had a female householder with no husband present, 10.5% had a male householder with no wife present, and 26.7% were non-families. 19.8% of all households were made up of individuals, and 5.8% had someone living alone who was 65 years of age or older. The average household size was 2.81 and the average family size was 3.11.

The median age in the city was 29.3 years. 31.8% of residents were under the age of 18; 8.6% were between the ages of 18 and 24; 26.8% were from 25 to 44; 26.6% were from 45 to 64; and 6.2% were 65 years of age or older. The gender makeup of the city was 51.2% male and 48.8% female.

2000 census
As of the census of 2000, there were 163 people, 62 households, and 40 families residing in the city. The racial makeup of the city was 100.00% White. Hispanic or Latino of any race were 1.23% of the population.

There were 62 households, out of which 41.9% had children under the age of 18 living with them, 54.8% were married couples living together, 9.7% had a female householder with no husband present, and 33.9% were non-families. 27.4% of all households were made up of individuals, and 11.3% had someone living alone who was 65 years of age or older. The average household size was 2.63 and the average family size was 3.22.

In the city, the population was spread out, with 31.9% under the age of 18, 6.7% from 18 to 24, 36.8% from 25 to 44, 12.9% from 45 to 64, and 11.7% who were 65 years of age or older. The median age was 30 years. For every 100 females, there were 111.7 males. For every 100 females age 18 and over, there were 113.5 males.

The median income for a household in the city was $35,833, and the median income for a family was $40,000. Males had a median income of $30,179 versus $23,333 for females. The per capita income for the city was $17,344. About 12.5% of families and 10.2% of the population were below the poverty line, including 7.8% of those under the age of eighteen and 12.5% of those 65 or over.

References

External links
 City of Pease home page

Cities in Mille Lacs County, Minnesota
Cities in Minnesota